Events from the year 1867 in Canada.

Incumbents

Crown 
 Monarch – Victoria

January to June

Governors 
 Governor General of Canada – Charles Monck, 4th Viscount Monck
 Lieutenant Governor of New Brunswick – vacant
 Lieutenant Governor of Nova Scotia – Sir William Fenwick Williams

Premiers 
 Premier of Canada – Narcisse-Fortunat Belleau
 Premier of New Brunswick – Peter Mitchell
 Premier of Nova Scotia – Charles Tupper

July to December

Federal government 
 Governor General – Charles Monck, 4th Viscount Monck 
 Prime Minister – John A. Macdonald (from July 1)
 Parliament – 1st (from November 6)

Provincial governments

Lieutenant governors     
Lieutenant Governor of New Brunswick – Charles Hastings Doyle (until October 18) then Francis Pym Harding  
Lieutenant Governor of Nova Scotia – Sir William Fenwick Williams (until October 18) then Charles Hastings Doyle    
Lieutenant Governor of Ontario – Henry William Stisted   
Lieutenant Governor of Quebec – Narcisse-Fortunat Belleau

Premiers   
Premier of New Brunswick – Andrew Rainsford Wetmore (from August 16)
Premier of Nova Scotia – Hiram Blanchard (July 4 – September 30) then William Annand (from November 4)
Premier of Ontario – John Sandfield Macdonald (from July 16)
Premier of Quebec – Pierre-Joseph-Olivier Chauveau (from July 15)

Events 
February 16 – John A. Macdonald marries his second wife Susan Agnes Bernard.
March 29 – Queen Victoria gives royal assent to the British North America Act, 1867.
July 1 – The Province of Canada, Nova Scotia, and New Brunswick are united into the Dominion of Canada by the British North America Act.
July 1 – Sir John A. Macdonald becomes the first prime minister of the Dominion of Canada.
July 1 – The Windsor Police Service is established.
July 4 – Hiram Blanchard becomes premier of Nova Scotia, replacing Charles Tupper.
July 15 – Pierre-Joseph-Olivier Chauveau becomes the first premier of Quebec.
July 16 – J. S. Macdonald becomes the first premier of Ontario.
August 7 – September 20 – The 1867 Canadian election sees John A. Macdonald's Conservatives elected as government.
September 3 – The 1867 Ontario election: J. S. Macdonald Liberal-Conservatives win a minority.
September 18 – The 1867 Nova Scotia election
November 6 – The 1st Canadian Parliament meets.
November 7 – William Annand becomes premier of Nova Scotia, replacing Hiram Blanchard.
December 7 – The first federal budget is presented by Finance Minister John Rose.

Full date unknown
Andrew R. Wetmore becomes premier of New Brunswick, replacing Peter Mitchell.
The 1867 Quebec election
The Parliamentary Press Gallery is established.
 Fall: Henry Seth Taylor steam buggy debuts at the Stanstead Fall Fair in Quebec, believed to be Canada's first car.

Births 
January 25 – Simon Fraser Tolmie, politician and 21st Premier of British Columbia (died 1937)
February 2 – Charles E. Saunders, agronomist (died 1937)
February 7 – John Livingstone Brown, politician (died 1953)
February 20 – Flora Denison, feminist
March 5 – Louis-Alexandre Taschereau, politician and 14th Premier of Quebec (died 1952)
March 31 – Noah Timmins, mining developer and executive (died 1936)
June 30 – Napoléon Turcot, politician (died 1939)
August 9 – Charles Ballantyne, politician (died 1950)
October 19 – Marie Lacoste Gérin-Lajoie, feminist and social activist (died 1945)
October 27 – Thomas Walter Scott, Politician and first Premier of Saskatchewan (died 1938)
November 1 – Newton Rowell, lawyer and politician (died 1941)
December 3 – William John Bowser, politician and Premier of British Columbia (died 1933)

Deaths 

July 23 – Samuel Harrison, farmer, lawyer, mill owner, politician, judge and 1st Joint Premiers of the Province of Canada (born 1802)
August 25 – Pierre-Flavien Turgeon, Archbishop of Quebec (born 1787)
September 7 – Jesse Ketchum, tanner, politician, and philanthropist (born 1782)
November 1 – John Strachan, first Anglican Bishop of Toronto (born 1778)
December 10 – Edward Whelan, journalist and politician (born 1824)

Historical documents
British House of Commons debates Confederation 

In first Speech from the Throne, Governor General Monck lists legislative agenda, including eastern railway and western expansion

Thomas D'Arcy McGee lectures on the state of cultural development in Canada 

Court validates a "country marriage," allowing a Metis man to inherit 

Report on Anglican mission work among and by Indigenous people in Rupert's Land

Photo: St. Regis Lacrosse Club

References

 
Years of the 19th century in Canada
Canada
1867 in North America